Magra Church is a church in Alingsås, Västergötland, Sweden. The small church building itself belongs to the parish of Bjärke, in the Diocese of Skara. The church was built sometime in the Middle Ages, probably in the 12th century. The pulpit was made in 1650, and its figurines were made 1693. In 1963, a large detached section was added in the southeast.

References

Churches in Västra Götaland County
12th-century churches in Sweden
Churches in the Diocese of Skara